Tanzer or Tänzer is a surname, Tänzer meaning "dancer" in German. Notable people with the surname include:

 Jacob Tanzer (born 1935), American attorney
 Johann Tanzer, Canadian sailboat designer
 Kurt Tanzer (1920 – 1960), World War II Luftwaffe fighter ace
 Stephen Tanzer, American wine critic
 Tommy Tanzer, former American baseball agent
 William Tans'ur (born Tanzer, 1706 – 1783), English hymn-writer, composer and teacher of music 
 Aaron Tänzer (1871 - 1937), Austrian rabbi
 Mihai Tänzer (1905 - 1993), Hungarian-Romanian football player

See also
Tanzer Industries, a Canadian boat builder, 1966-86

German-language surnames
Jewish surnames
Occupational surnames